John William Falkiner (16 May 1848 – 14 November 1927) was an Australian politician.

Falkiner was born in Epping Forest in Tasmania in 1848. In 1882 he was elected to the Tasmanian House of Assembly, representing the seat of Morven. In 1886 his seat was replaced by Evandale, which he represented until his defeat in 1891. He died in 1927 in Longford.

References

1848 births
1927 deaths
Members of the Tasmanian House of Assembly